Eupithecia matheri is a moth in the family Geometridae first described by Frederick H. Rindge in 1985. It is found in the US states of Connecticut, New York, New Jersey, Pennsylvania, Virginia, North Carolina, Mississippi, Louisiana, Texas and possibly Kansas.

The length of the forewings is 9 mm for males and 8.5–10 mm for females. The forewings are gray with a faint brown tinge. The hindwings are paler than the forewings, but darkened along the anal margin. Adults are on wing from late January to the beginning of April.

References

Moths described in 1985
matheri
Moths of North America